Pancalia schwarzella is a moth in the family Cosmopterigidae. It is found in almost all of Europe, except the south-east. In southern Europe, it is mainly found in mountainous areas up to altitudes of about 2,600 meters. In the east, the range extends to the mountains of Central Asia, Sibiria and from Zabaykalsky Krai to the Kamchatka Peninsula.

The wingspan is 11–16 mm. It is very similar to Pancalia leuwenhoekella but has a more obliquely-angled tornal silver and no white section towards the apex of the antennae. Adults are on wing from late April to early July. Adults visit the flowers of various plants, including Taraxacum, Hieracium, Bellis perennis and Lotus corniculatus.

The larvae feed on Viola canina and Viola hirta.

References

External links
lepiforum.de

Moths described in 1798
Antequerinae
Moths of Europe